Emil and the Detectives is a 1935 British family adventure film directed by Milton Rosmer and starring John Williams, George Hayes and Mary Glynne.

It is a remake of the 1931 German film Emil and the Detectives with the main setting moved from Berlin to London. Otherwise it follows the original very closely, largely using Billy Wilder's screenplay, the music by Allan Gray, even recreating many of the same camera shots. It was made at Shepperton Studios.

Synopsis
While on a train from his home in the countryside to stay with his grandmother in London, a boy named Emil suspects that he has been robbed of his money by a suspicious-looking man in the same carriage wearing a bowler hat. In London, with the help of a gang of street children, he pursues the suspect until he is eventually able to recover the money.

Cast
 John Williams as Emil Blake  
 George Hayes as The Man In The Bowler Hat - Sam Pinker  
 Mary Glynne as Mrs. Blake  
 Clare Greet as Grandma 
 George Merritt as PC  
 Marion Foster as Polly  
 Donald Pittman as Gussy  
 Robert Rietti as Professor  
 John Singer as Tuesday  
 Derek Blomfield as Jerry 
 Norman Atkyns as Man  
 Ricky Hyland as The Flying Stag

References

Bibliography
 Low, Rachael. Filmmaking in 1930s Britain. George Allen & Unwin, 1985.
 Wood, Linda. British Films, 1927-1939. British Film Institute, 1986.

External links

1935 films
British children's adventure films
British remakes of German films
Films shot at Shepperton Studios
Films based on works by Erich Kästner
Films directed by Milton Rosmer
Films set in England
Films set in London
Films shot in London
British black-and-white films
1930s children's adventure films
1930s English-language films
1930s British films